Salsabila Khairunnisa (born 2003) is an Indonesian environmental activist. At the age of 15, she co-founded the Jaga Rimba youth movement which aims to fight deforestation and exploitation in Indonesia. In 2020, she was nominated one the BBC's 100 Women Award.

Biography 
Khairunnisa was born in 2003 in Jakarta. In March 2019 at the age of 15, she co-founded the youth organisation Jaga Rimba, which aims to counter deforestation and act as an advocate for the environment in Indonesia. Jaga Rimba is closely connected to the community who lived at Laman Kinipan, who was evicted from the village in 2018 by a palm oil company. The business PT Sawit Mandiri Lestari (SML) claimed they had the rights to use the land the community lived on to grow palm. They evicted the villagers, resulting in famine, as well as affecting the community of orangutans who lived in the area. Jaga Rimba campaigns to ensure that the indigenous people of the Kinipan Forest, one of Borneo's last rainforests do not lose their land.

In addition to her work with Jaga Rimba, Khairunnisa is one of the leaders of the school strike for climate in Indonesia. She is inspired by Greta Thunberg and Mitzi Jonelle Tan. In 2020 she was nominated for the BBC's 100 Women Award.

References 

Indonesian environmentalists
2003 births
People from Jakarta
BBC 100 Women
Youth climate activists
Living people